Celso Luis Gomes (born 2 September 1964) is a former Brazilian football player.

Club statistics

References

External links

1964 births
Living people
Brazilian footballers
Brazilian expatriate footballers
J1 League players
Expatriate footballers in Japan
Shimizu S-Pulse players
Association football defenders